Elections to North Lanarkshire Council were held on 6 May 1999, the same day as the other Scottish local government elections and the Scottish Parliament general election.

Election results

Ward results

External links
North Lanarkshire Council

1999
1999 Scottish local elections